Ashland Place Historic District may refer to:

Ashland Place Historic District (Mobile, Alabama), listed on the NRHP in Alabama
Ashland Place Historic District (Phoenix, Arizona), listed on the NRHP in Maricopa County, Arizona